2014 Azerbaijan Supercup will be the 5th edition of the Azerbaijan Supercup since its establishment in 1992. The match will be contested between the 2013–14 Azerbaijan Premier League champions Qarabağ and the 2013–14 Azerbaijan Cup champions Neftchi Baku.

Match

Details

See also
 2013–14 Azerbaijan Premier League
 2013–14 Azerbaijan Cup

References

2014
Supercup
Neftçi PFK matches
Qarabağ FK matches